Choi Min-ho (born 1991), South Korean singer and actor, member of Shinee.
 Choi Min-ho (badminton) (born 1980), South Korean badminton player
 Choi Min-ho (judoka) (born 1980), South Korean judoka
 Choi Min-ho (volleyball) (born 1988), South Korean volleyball player
 Minos (birth name Choi Min-ho, born 1983), South Korean rapper